Fritz Ravn (13 September 1929 – 28 August 2013) was a Danish racing cyclist. He rode in the 1958 Tour de France.

References

External links
 

1929 births
2013 deaths
Danish male cyclists
Place of birth missing